Gašper Potočnik (born 20 December 1980) is a Slovenian professional basketball coach, currently serving as head coach for Szolnoki Olajbányász of the Hungarian league.

On December 14, 2016, Potočnik was named EGIS Körmend new head coach, replacing Teo Čizmić. On August 15, 2018, Potočnik was named Bnei Herzliya head coach, signing a two-year deal, but on January 15, 2019, Potočnik parted ways with Herzliya after four consecutive losses.

References

External links 
 Union Olimpija Profile

1980 births
Living people
BC Körmend coaches
KK Olimpija coaches
KK Krka coaches
Slovenian basketball coaches
Sportspeople from Ljubljana